The Annazids or Banu Annaz (990/991–1117) was a Kurdish Sunni Muslim dynasty which ruled an oscillating territory on the present-day frontier between Iran and Iraq for about 130 years. The Annazids were related by marriage to the Hasanwayhids who they were in fierce rivalry with. The legitimacy of the Annazid rulers stemmed from the Buyid amir Bahāʾ al-Dawla and the dynasty relied on the Shadhanjan Kurds.

Etymology 
Ali ibn al-Athir stated that the name ʿAnnāz derived from the word ʿanz meaning 'she goat' and signifies the owner, merchant, or shepherd of goats. However, Sharafkhan Bidlisi and Hamdallah Mustawfi put forward the name Banū ʿAyyār arguing that the Arabic word ayyār meaning 'smart' or 'shrewd' was also common in Kurdish and Persian and was used as a nickname for Kurdish families, while nor ʿanz or ʿannāz are mentioned in Kurdish dictionaries.

Geography 
The Annazids principally controlled Kermanshah, Hulwan, Dinavar, Shahrizor, Daquq, Daskara, Mandali and Numaniyah.

History 
The founder of the Annazids dynasty was Abu’l-Fatḥ Moḥammad b. ʿAnnāz (d. 1010-11) who ruled Hulwan and likely attached to the administration of Baha al-Dawla of the Buyid dynasty. In the first twenty years of his rule, he fought the Banu Uqayl and temporarily captured Daquq and also fought Banu Mazyad around Khanaqin.

In 1006, Badr ibn Hasanwayh and Abu’l-Ḥasan ʿAlī b. Mazyad of the Hasanwayhids sent 10,000 soldiers against the Annazids which forced Abu’l-Fatḥ to seek refuge among the Buyids in Baghdad. In a treaty between the two dynasties that same year, Abu’l-Fatḥ declared himself a vassal of the Hasanwayhids.

Abu’l-Fatḥ was succeeded by his son Ḥosām-al-dawla Abu’l-Šawk (ruled until about 1046) whose tenure was filled with destruction and internal conflict. For this reason, his territory fluctuated greatly; at its highest it reached Hillah, while it at its lowest was limited to western Iran. He married into the Banu Mazyad dynasty which improved relations between the two dynasties. After the death of Badr ibn Hasanwayh, Lur tribes and Shadhanjan came under the control of Abu’l-Šawk. As a reaction the Buyids in Hamadan released the son of Badr ibn Hasanwayh, Tahir b. Hilal, who had been captured by them during battle. Tahir b. Hilal marched against the Annazids who had to retreat to Hulwan. However, the battle ended when Tahir b. Hilal settled in Nahavand having married into the family of Abu’l-Šawk. Abu’l-Šawk would subsequently kill Tahir b. Hilal and captured all Annazid territory. In 1029, Abu’l-Šawk went on to fight and defeat the Shams al-Dawla and the Oghuz Turks capturing Hamadan, Dinavar and Asadabad. In 1030, he captured Daquq from the Banu Mazyad and Kermanshah was captured in 1038/39. He then led his troops towards Arnaba and Ḵūlanǰān held by the Quhids. In 1040, he was captured trying to advance towards land controlled by his brother Mohalhel (1011-c. 1055), who received support from the Kakuyids. The Kakuyids went on to capture large parts of Annazid territory. Abu’l-Šawk was allowed to return to Hulwan.

Relations between Abu’l-Šawk and his brother improved with mediation from Shams-al Dawla but hostilities renewed after Mohalhel refused to release the son of Abu’l-Šawk, Abu’l-Fatḥ b. Abu’l-Šawk. Abu’l-Šawk attacked Mohalhel twice but failed to free his son who would die in captivity. Shortly after, in 1045, Turkmen ruler Tughril sent his half-brother Ibrahim Inal to Kurdish areas and Abu’l-Šawk had to flee from Dinavar to Kermanshah and then to the citadel of Sirvan on the Diyala River where many Kurds rallied around him. The two brothers tried to unite, but the foreces of Inal succeeded in further capturing Hulwan, Mahidasht and attacked Khanaqin. Abu’l-Šawk died in April 1046 and his supporters rallied around his brother.

Son of Abu’l-Šawk, Saʿdī b. Abu’l-Šawk, chose to side with Inal and therefore renewed internal Annazid tensions. When Inal captured Hulwan in 1046, he dedicated the battle to the slain son of Abu’l-Šawk, Tahir b. Hilal.

Annazid rule declined afterwards and the last mention of the dynasty was in the 12th century when Sorḵāb b. ʿAnnāz became a ruler of Lorestan. This became possible because of an epidemic in 1048/49 prompting a withdrawal from the region by the Oghuz Turks. Inal later allocated more land in the region to the Annazid dynasty but Mohalhel ultimately died in Seljuk captivity.

All important cultural and economic centers would also suffer in the following centuries. Regarding the legacy of the Annazids, historian Franz argued:

After the Annazid era, the territory was incorporated into Khorshidi territory.

References

History of Kurdistan
Kurdish dynasties
History of Hamadan Province
History of Kermanshah Province
History of Lorestan Province
States and territories disestablished in the 1110s
States and territories established in the 990s
History of Sulaymaniyah Governorate